Current research indicates that autistic people have higher rates of LGBT identities and feelings than the general population. A variety of explanations for this have been proposed; The Lancet's "Commission on the future of care and clinical research in autism" commented that it "might be part of a different concept of self, less reliance on or reference to social norms, or part of a neurodiverse lived experience of (and outlook on) the world."

Autism and sexual orientation

Early claims
Early claims that autistic people lack a sex drive or desire for sexuality have been regarded as an inaccurate and negative stereotype. These claims were a result of methodological problems. More recent evidence indicates that most autistic people express an interest in both romance and sexuality.

Autistic population
Autistic people are less likely to identify as heterosexual than their non-autistic counterparts. Some attempt to explain this as part of an association between autism, prenatal hormones, and sexual orientation. That is not the only proposed explanation, however. While there is a broad consensus that autistic people are substantially more likely to be non-heterosexual than the general population and to belong to gender minorities, there is great variation in estimates of the size of these effects, and most research suggests that the majority of autistic people are heterosexual. Studies on sexual orientation and autism suggest that more autistic people have homosexual and bisexual feelings compared to the general population. Studies have indicated higher incidence of asexuality among autistic people, though a 2019 review article stated that this "should be interpreted with caution, bearing in mind the difficulty of establishing social relations in persons with ASD." Similarly, a survey of asexual individuals found that about 7% to 8% of respondents had acquired an autism diagnosis, approximately 4 times larger than the American population estimate.

The increased incidence of non-heterosexuality in the autistic population is present when measuring for self-reported sexual orientation, sexual behavior, and sexual interests alike.

A 2018 study suggested that individuals with the broader autism phenotype (BAP) had a higher likelihood of same-sex attraction.

Autistic people by gender
Some studies have indicated that autistic women have higher rates of non-heterosexual orientation than autistic men do. This was also corroborated by an online survey conducted by the University of Cambridge and published in Autism Research. That survey suggested that autistic women had a wider range of sexual identification than both their non-autistic counterparts and autistic men. Younger respondents had a higher likelihood for reporting themselves as homosexual than did older respondents. According to a 2021 review, some studies indicated that autistic females were about three to four times as likely to identify as bisexual, when compared to non-autistic females.

Sex education
Some autistic people who participated in sex education programs have reported that more information about non-heterosexuality in these programs would have better assisted their needs. However, while a report in the Journal of Autism and Developmental Disorders characterized this as an issue that affected autistic individuals, it stated that information about sexual orientation (and gender identity) was "severely lacking" within sex education programs for the general population as well, in the United States.

According to a 2015 study, autistic people may be more tolerant towards homosexuality.

Autism and gender identity

Gender identification
A 2018 study on gender identity in autistic people, found that autistic people, and especially those assigned female at birth (AFAB), had lower identification with their assigned gender at birth, and lower self-esteem about that gender, than typically developing controls.

Gender dysphoria in children
Gender dysphoria is a diagnosis given to transgender people who experience discomfort related to their gender identity. Some studies have shown that autistic children may be more likely to experience gender dysphoria. There are also other studies that describe other possible causes or explanations for these diagnosis.

While scientific literature is filled with case studies of autistic children with gender dysphoria, including boys and girls, the first study to assess the convergence of gender dysphoria and autism was not published until 2010.

Researchers in the Netherlands examined 129 children and adolescents who were diagnosed with gender identity disorder (GID under DSM-4 diagnosis) in 2010, finding that 4.7%, that being 6 individuals, were also diagnosed as autistic. In another study, from December 2011 to June 2013, over half of the 166 young adults referred to the NHS Gender Identity Development Service were assessed as autistic.

In March 2014, researchers from the Children's National Medical Center, Arcadia University, and National Institute of Mental Health, assessed gender diversity in autistic children, and found that those who were autistic were 7.59 times more likely to be gender diverse than those who were not autistic. One of the study's authors, psychologist John Strang, argued that children were more likely to be gender non-conforming because they were not as "worried about what people thought" as those who were older and were not noticing "the social expectations or the social biases" toward transgender people.

New York University researchers, using a sample of 492 children, stated in February 2016 that autistic children were seven times more likely to experience gender variance as compared to those not on the spectrum.

Overlapping demographics
Some studies have noted an overlap between those with autism and those who are transgender. British researchers in 2011 concluded that trans men had more autistic traits than trans women. However, a study by British researchers in 2013 concluded that there was "no significant difference" between trans men and trans women in autistic traits observed. Steven Stagg and Jaime Vincent of Anglia Ruskin University concluded in September 2019 that some of those seeking advice and help for their gender identity may be autistic, whether diagnosed or not, with these abilities impeding possible support, and urged clinicians treating individuals who are transgender or non-binary, especially those assigned female at birth, to consider whether they have undiagnosed ASD. Four researchers in January 2020 suggested "overlap between autism and transgender identity", possibly more in trans men than trans women, and stated that anxiety and depression were the highest in autistic individuals who were transgender. Scientists with the Autism Research Centre at University of Cambridge, using data from 600,000 adults in the UK, concluded in August 2020 that adults who were transgender or gender diverse were three to six times more likely to have an autistic diagnosis than those who were cisgender, and suggested that between 3.5 and 6.5% of transgender and gender diverse adults in the UK are autistic.

Other researchers have noted the prevalence of autistic traits among those who identify as non-binary or genderqueer. Two Warwick University researchers, utilizing data from 446 UK adult respondents, concluded in January 2016 that, based on their sample, genderqueer individuals were more likely to be autistic than any other group with gender dysphoria.

Overlapping traits
Some sources have alternative explanations for either the Gender Dysphoria or Gender Identity Disorder diagnosis, or the Autism Spectrum Disorder diagnosis, generally explaining some traits found in either diagnosis to be a symptom of the other, or found to be a symptom of the other when combined with another diagnosis.

Starting in the 1990s, some articles suggested a connection between those with ASD and Gender Dysphoria having unusual interests, pre-occupations, or obsessive–compulsive disorder (OCD), providing an alternative explanation for one or both diagnoses. Those with "unusual interests" and "pre-occupations" to feminine dresses, activities and objects, to instead have these interests or pre-occupations due to "the need for sensory input belonging to the ASD diagnosis". Some sources describe the connection between OCD, ASD, and gender dysphoria, to be more of an obsession about gender-related material due to the OCD caused by ASD, and not a true diagnosis of gender dysphoria. One study also found that those assigned male at birth with gender dysphoria were more likely to have obsessions and compulsions, with many of those being gender related, which may support this hypothesis. However this study also found no symptoms of this in those assigned female at birth, so there may be a different underlying factor.

One study suggested that those with ASD can have social issues, and others missing social cues about a child's gender presentation may cause them to develop gender dysphoria. Another study suggested the opposite, and that those with gender dysphoria may exhibit ASD symptoms due to their gender dysphoria diagnosis, however the article also states this is unclear whether it should be a separate diagnosis.

In May 2022, a systematic review and meta-analysis showed a relationship between autistic traits and feelings of gender dysphoria in the general population. The researchers also found a high prevalence of gender dysphoria among autistic people. They also found more autism diagnoses and autistic traits among those with gender dysphoria. The study concludes that the data suggests a link between autism and gender dysphoria, but the nature and scope of the link requires further investigation.

Screening for co-occurrence
A study by Boston Children's Hospital researchers in October 2016 reported that about 23 percent of young people with gender dysphoria at the on-site gender clinic had Asperger's syndrome, and recommended "routine autism screening at gender clinics".

A May 2022 systematic review and meta-analysis suggested that a link between autism and gender incongruence may lead to greater awareness among clinicians, so people with gender incongruence are screened for autism, and autistic people are screened for gender issues. The authors noted that the co-occurence of autism and gender dysphoria may represent a heightened risk for the individual's mental health.

Gender transition
In December 2014, four researchers concluded that being on the autism spectrum does not "preclude gender transition" and suggested methods for assisting such individuals in "exploring their gender identities". One of the study's authors, Katherine Rachlin, said that, sometimes, being transgender can "look like the spectrum experience" to clinicians. In March 2015, a study from researchers at the Yale School of Medicine stated that those on the autism spectrum should be treated equally to other individuals for gender dysphoria, and suggested that clinicians "broaden the social frame" and facilitate an "exploration of gender roles". A Finnish study in April 2015 recommended that the autism spectrum be recognized seriously in developing guidelines for treating "child and adolescent gender dysphoria".

A 2022 survey of gender clinic healthcare clinicians found there were often differences in communication and thinking styles between the clinicians and autistic patients. The study concluded that adaptations should be made, including training for clinicians on working with autistic patients, and adjustments made in the clinical setting.

WPATH SOC Version 8, published in August 2022, states that there is no evidence that withholding gender-affirming care from individuals with neurodevelopmental conditions has any benefit. WPATH SOC 8 further recommends that healthcare professionals working with gender-diverse adolescents receive training and develop expertise in autism spectrum disorder and other neurodevelopmental presentations.

Autistic camouflaging
In a 2021 study on autistic camouflaging, gender-diverse autistic adults were found to use more autistic camouflaging than cisgender autistic adults.

In popular culture

Autistic characters that are part of the LGBTQ community are occasionally depicted in popular culture, whether in literature, animated or live-action series. Some have called for better representation. For instance, in June 2015, author Heidi Cullinan wrote in Spectrum that there is not nearly enough works of fiction with autistic people and even fewer who are part of the LGBTQ community, inspiring her to write a story with a gay autistic protagonist. She also said that autistic people deserve to see themselves in stories, like anyone else. In March 2021, queer autistic novelist Naoise Dolan echoed this in an interview with PinkNews, calling for more visibility, saying that popular culture and art would be improved if "there were more queer autistics out there," along with other groups that are marginalized. She also criticized bad portrayals of autistic characters and expressed her desire to "deliberately write the most counter-stereotypical autistic character possible" in her novel, Exciting Times.

Occasionally, LGBTQ autistic characters appear in literature. For example, a 2015 novel, Carry the Ocean, by Heidi Cullinan also had a gay protagonist. In the novel, the protagonist, Jeremey Samon, meets an autistic boy named Emmet Washington, who wants to date him, and through the course of the book, their romantic relationship develops. Other characters in literature are lesbians. For example, Ada Hoffman's debut novel, in June 2019, The Outside, has a lesbian and autistic protagonist, Yasira Shien, who once had a lover named Tiv. The book's sequel, "The Fallen," came out in July 2021, with a reappearance of Yasira, and the book was praised for its "excellent neurodiverse representation." Xan West's 2019 novella, "Their Troublesome Crush," has a character, Ernest, who is openly autistic and demiromantic. West said they wrote the character from their own experience as an autistic demiromantic person. Ernest has been described as "a show tunes–loving submissive," and has a metamour, the partner of his partner, named Nora. Furthermore, Judith, the protagonist of Xan West's 2020 novel, Tenderness, is an "autistic Jewish bisexual midsize fat femme" who has chronic pain. Zack Smedley's 2019 novel, Tonight We Rule the World tells the story of Owen, a "bisexual high schooler...on the autism spectrum."

Some creators and characters of animated series are autistic and part of the LGBTQ community. The creator of Dead End: Paranormal Park, Hamish Steele, a gay man who is autistic, has said that he incorporated his experiences into characters such as Norma Khan in the show of the same name, who is LGBTQ and autistic. The Owl House is the only Disney Channel series with an openly LGBTQ+ protagonist, Luz Noceda, who has an autistic infinity symbol on her laptop.

Live-action television series have LGBTQ autistic characters as well. For instance, in March 2020, it was announced that the series Everything's Gonna Be Okay was introducing a "queer storyline" for autistic protagonist Matilda, who explores her sexual identity as a pansexual woman, and her friend, Drea, becomes her girlfriend. The show's creator, Josh Thomas, told The Advocate that he likes "having queer people in my show", noted that autistic people have "an extreme emotional vulnerability", and said that is "exciting that people on the spectrum are boldly leading and as far as identity goes." In the course of filming the first season, he realised that he is autistic himself and obtained a formal diagnosis. In the second season his character (a gay man) comes to realise he, too, is autistic. The rebooted Australian series Heartbreak High also features a queer autistic character, Quinni, played by autistic actor Chloé Hayden and written with her input.

References

Further reading
 
 
 
 
 
 
 
 
 
 
 
 
 

Sociological and cultural aspects of autism
Sexual orientation and psychology